Reza Yazdani may refer to:

 Reza Yazdani (born 1984), Iranian wrestler
 Reza Yazdani (singer) (born 1973), Iranian singer